Gramma dejongi, also known as golden basslet, is a species of fish in the family Grammatidae native to reef environments of the tropical waters in the Caribbean Sea.

Appearance
The fish is distinctive among the basslets as having a primary color that is not purple. It is instead primarily golden yellow with purple patches on its fins and a slight path on the belly near the fins. There is also a black spot on the dorsal fin. It is relatively small at about 7 cm (2.7 in), smaller than the Royal gramma.

Range
This species is considered to be largely endemic to the waters around Cuba. However a solitary individual has been found off the coast of the Little Cayman Island in the Cayman Islands. Whether this represents another population or a displaced individual cannot be confirmed.

In aquariums
This species is popular as an aquarium pet, but due to its recent discovery it has not been as popular as other species. Its temperament is similar to that of the other Gramma species. Of note it is the first basslet to have a distinct color morph bred by enthusiasts, that being the "Platinum" variant, in which the purple coloration is replaced by a white color.

References

Fish described in 2010
Gramma (fish)
Endemic fauna of Cuba
Fish of Cuba